Ingeborg Breines (born 14 August 1945 in Singerfjord) is a Norwegian peace educator. She is senior advisor to the World Summit of Nobel Peace Laureates. She served as director of the Women and a Culture of Peace Programme of UNESCO and from 2009 to 2016 was President of the International Peace Bureau.

Education 
Breines studied philosophy and French literature at the University of Nantes and the University of Oslo.

International Men's Day 
Breines was one of the advocators in the creation of International Men's Day while serving UNESCO.

Selected publications 

 Towards a Women's Agenda for a Culture of Peace.
 Creating an Active Disgust for War. 
 60 women contributing to the 60 years of UNESCO.

See also 
 UNESCO
 World Summit of Nobel Peace Laureates

References

External links 
 Nobel Peace Summit

1945 births
Living people